Vojtěch Rückschloss (born 14 March 1969) is a Slovak boxer. He competed in the men's heavyweight event at the 1992 Summer Olympics.

References

1969 births
Living people
Heavyweight boxers
Slovak male boxers
Czechoslovak male boxers
Olympic boxers of Czechoslovakia
Boxers at the 1992 Summer Olympics
Sportspeople from Ružomberok